The Iajuddin Ahmed Cabinet led the Caretaker government of Bangladesh from 29 October 2006 to 11 January 2007 following the end of term of the Bangladesh National Party administration.

Background

According to the constitution of Bangladesh, the immediate past Chief Justice is appointed as Chief Advisor during a caretaker government. After Justice KM Hasan declined the position, reportedly because of ill health, five other men were considered for the position. The last option was for the President to take over, as provided for in the constitution. Iajuddin Ahmed was sworn in as the Chief Advisor of the Caretaker Government on 29 October 2006 after the main political parties failed to agree on another candidate. Dr. Iajuddin Ahmed resigned from his position On 11 January 2007.

List of Advisors

References

Cabinets of Bangladesh
Cabinets established in 2006